Hamilton Creek is a stream in Crawford and 
Washington counties in the U.S. state of Missouri. It is a tributary of the Meramec River.

The stream headwaters arise just west of Missouri Route 155 and about one mile north of Pea Ridge and the Pea Ridge Mine (at ). The stream flows to the northwest to enter the Meramec in eastern Crawford County just west of the Washington-Crawford county line (at ).

Hamilton Creek was formerly called Hamilton Branch; the namesake of the creek is unknown.

See also
List of rivers of Missouri

References

Rivers of Crawford County, Missouri
Rivers of Washington County, Missouri
Rivers of Missouri